Gonatopus  is a genus of solitary wasps of the family Dryinidae, sometimes called hump-backed pincer wasps. The wingless females have large scissor-like appendages at the tips of the front legs which are used to catch the leafhopper grubs which act as hosts to the larvae of these wasps. The larva consumes the leafhopper grub from the inside. An indication that a leafhopper is hosting a grub is a cyst of accumulated shed integuments which surround and protect the growing wasp larva.

Species
The following list is alist of the species included within the genus Gonatopus found in Europe: A new species Gonatopus jacki described from the Florida, USA in 2018.

Gonatopus albolineatus Kieffer, 1904
Gonatopus albosignatus Kieffer, 1904
Gonatopus ater Olmi, 1984
Gonatopus atlanticus Olmi, 1984
Gonatopus audax (Olmi, 1984)
Gonatopus azorensis (Olmi, 1989)
Gonatopus baeticus (Ceballos, 1927)
Gonatopus bicolor (Haliday, 1828)
Gonatopus bilineatus Kieffer, 1904
Gonatopus blascoi Olmi 1995
Gonatopus brunneicollis (Richards, 1972)
Gonatopus camelinus Kieffer, 1904
Gonatopus canariensis (Olmi, 1984)
Gonatopus chersonesius Ponomarenko, 1970
Gonatopus clavipes (Thunberg 1827)
Gonatopus distinctus Kieffer, 1906
Gonatopus distinguendus Kieffer, 1905
Gonatopus doderoi (Olmi & Currado, 1974)
Gonatopus dromedarius (Costa, 1882)
Gonatopus europaeus (Olmi, 1986)
Gonatopus felix (Olmi, 1984)
Gonatopus focarilei (Olmi, 1984)
Gonatopus formicarius Ljungh, 1810
Gonatopus formicicolus (Richards, 1939)
Gonatopus fortunatus Olmi, 1993
Gonatopus graecus Olmi, 1984
Gonatopus helleni (Raatikainen, 1961)
Gonatopus horvathi Kieffer, 1906
Gonatopus kenitrensis Olmi, 1990
Gonatopus lindbergi Hellen, 1930
Gonatopus longicollis (Kieffer, 1905)
Gonatopus lunatus Klug, 1810
Gonatopus lycius small>Olmi, 1989
Gonatopus mediterraneus Olmi, 1990
Gonatopus nearcticus (Fenton, 1927)
Gonatopus pallidus (Ceballos, 1927)
Gonatopus pedestris Dalman, 1818
Gonatopus planiceps Kieffer, 1904
Gonatopus plumbeus Olmi, 1984
Gonatopus popovi Ponomarenko, 1965
Gonatopus pulicarius Klug, 1810
Gonatopus rosellae (Currado & Olmi, 1974)
Gonatopus solidus (Haupt, 1938)
Gonatopus spectrum (Snellen van Vollenhoven, 1874)
Gonatopus striatus Kieffer, 1905
Gonatopus subtilis Olmi, 1984
Gonatopus tenerifei Olmi, 1984
Gonatopus tussaci (Olmi, 1989)
Gonatopus unilineatus Kieffer, 1904
Gonatopus vistosus Olmi, 1984

References

Dryinidae
Hymenoptera genera
Taxa named by Sven Ingemar Ljungh